The 1936–37 season was Manchester City F.C.'s forty-sixth season of league football. The club won its first-ever league title, scoring a record 107 goals.

Match results

Legend

Football League First Division

Source:
Note: Game vs Brentford on 28 November abandoned after 40 minutes.

FA Cup

Source:

League table

Results summary

Player details

See also
List of Manchester City F.C. seasons

References

Manchester City F.C. seasons
Manchester City F.C.
English football championship-winning seasons